The 2008–09 Wisconsin Badgers women's ice hockey team was the Badgers' 9th season. Led by head coach Mark Johnson, the Badgers went 21–2–5 in the WCHA.

Regular season
On October 18, the Badgers beat Bemidji State in the United States Hockey Hall of Fame Game.

Roster

Player stats

Skaters

Goaltenders

Schedule and results
Green Background indicates a win.
Red Background indicates a loss.
White Background indicates an overtime tie/loss.
* Non-Conference Game.
(SO) Shootout.

September 2008
Record:2–0–0 Home:2–0–0 Away:0-0-0

October 2008
Record:7–0–1 Home:3–0–1 Away:4–0–0

November 2008
Record:6–0–1 Home:4–0–1 Away: 2–0–0
The matches from November 21 and 22 were played in Fort Myers, Florida.

December 2008
Record:2–0–0 Home:2–0–0 Away: 0-0-0

January 2009
Record:4–1–1 Home:2–0–0 Away: 2–1–1

February 2009
Record:0-0-0 Home:0-0-0 Away: 0-0-0

Postseason

NCAA Hockey tournament
NCAA Frozen Four Semifinals (played in Boston, Ma.)
Wisconsin 5, Minnesota-Duluth 1
NCAA Frozen Four Finals (played in Boston, Ma.)
Wisconsin 5, Mercyhurst 0
The game was played on March 22. Jessie Vetter stopped 37 shots for an NCAA record 14th shutout of the season (it was also her second in a national championship game) as Wisconsin won its third women's hockey title in four years with a 5–0 victory over Mercyhurst.

Awards and honors
Jessie Vetter, Patty Kazmaier Award

See also
2008–09 Wisconsin Badgers men's ice hockey season

References

External links
2008–2009 Schedule

Wisconsin
Wisconsin Badgers women's ice hockey seasons
NCAA women's ice hockey Frozen Four seasons
NCAA women's ice hockey championship seasons
Wiscon
Wiscon